Jakarta Bay is a bay north of North Jakarta city. The Thousand Islands are located in Jakarta Bay. 13 rivers flow into the bay. The majority of the bay's coastal communities consist of people living below the poverty line, in conditions of poor sanitation. Nutrient inputs from agricultural runoff, industrial pollution, and wastewater have led to eutrophication, which in turn led to changes in the area's biodiversity. Harmful algal blooms have been observed.

It was known as Bay of Batavia by the Dutch, who founded their city of Batavia, an administrative capital of the Dutch East Indies Company, in 1619.

References

External links
 TelukJakarta.net

Bays of Indonesia
Landforms of Jakarta